Carex werdermannii is a species of sedge native to Chile.

References 

werdermannii
Flora of Chile